USS Chestnut Hill (ID-2526) was a United States Navy tanker that served during World War I.

Chestnut Hill, was launched 23 August 1917 by shipbuilder Pennsylvania Shipbuilding Company at Gloucester City, New Jersey, and acquired by the U.S. Navy 14 March 1918 and commissioned the same day. She reported to the Naval Overseas Transportation Service.

The Chestnut Hill served as an escort and fuel ship in the Azores from 22 March – 15 June 1918 for two convoys of submarine chasers. On 9 October 1918 Sub Chaser USS SC-219 sank in the Mid-Atlantic Ocean between Bermuda and the Azores due to an explosion and fire while refueling alongside "Chestnut Hill". 4 killed, 8 wounded.

References

 

Ships built in Gloucester City, New Jersey
1917 ships